Alfred Hickman was an English actor.

Alfred Hickman may also refer to:
Sir Alfred Hickman, 1st Baronet (1830–1910), industrialist and Conservative politician
Sir Alfred Edward Hickman, 2nd Baronet (1885–1947), of the Hickman baronets
Sir (Alfred) Howard Whitby Hickman, 3rd Baronet (1920–1979), of the Hickman baronets